This article lists the tallest buildings in Metro Iloilo  in Panay Island, in the Western Visayas in the Philippines.

Iloilo City, the regional capital of Western Visayas (Region VI) in the Philippines, has many projects by the major players in real estate, such as condominiums, hotels, and other infrastructure projects. The city aimed to become one of the Meetings, Incentives, Conferences, & Exhibitions (MICE) centers of the Philippines after it was chosen to host several major meetings, including the APEC ministerial meetings in 2015.

The Iloilo City district of Mandurriao has the highest concentration of high-rise buildings among other city districts. It has been the home of the tallest building in the city since the completion of the 10-storey Iloilo Business Hotel in 2007. High-rise buildings are also being built in the City Proper, Jaro, and right outside the city limits in Pavia, Iloilo.

Tallest completed buildings 
This list ranks the high-rise buildings in Iloilo City. This includes spires and architectural details, but does not include antenna masts. The rankings are based on the buildings' total height. The 18-storey BPO Office Twin Tower, SM Strata Tower 1, is currently the tallest building in Iloilo, standing at 84 meters. It will soon be dethroned by the Cebu Landmasters, Inc. (CLI)'s 33-storey Terranza Residences in downtown Iloilo City, with a height of 116 meters.

Buildings in progress
Only high-rise buildings in Metro Iloilo are included in this list. Some of the building's details, such as height and completion year, have yet to be confirmed or revealed.

Timeline of tallest building
This is a chronological record holder list of the tallest buildings in Iloilo City.

List by city geographical district
The following list shows the tallest and number of high-rise buildings in the seven geographical districts of Iloilo City.

See also
 List of tallest buildings in Asia
 List of tallest buildings in the Philippines

 List of tallest buildings in Cebu City

References

Iloilo
Tallest buildings